The 2006 Dodge/Save Mart 350 was a NASCAR Nextel Cup Series stock car race held on June 25, 2006 at Infineon Raceway in Sonoma, California. Contested over 110 laps on a 1.99 mile (3.202 km) road course, it was the 16th race of the 2006 NASCAR Nextel Cup Series season. Jeff Gordon of Hendrick Motorsports won the race.

This is the 100th road course race in Nextel Cup series history.

Background
The course, Infineon Raceway (now called Sonoma Raceway), is one of two road courses to hold NASCAR races, the other is Watkins Glen International. The Chute was only used for NASCAR events such as this race, and was criticized by many drivers, who preferred the full layout.

Qualifying

Results

Race Statistics
 Time of race: 2:57:36
 Average Speed: 
 Pole Speed: 
 Cautions: 7 for 12 laps
 Margin of Victory: 1.250 sec
 Lead changes: 9
 Percent of race run under caution: 10.9%         
 Average green flag run: 12.2 laps

References 

Dodge Save Mart 350
Dodge Save Mart 350
NASCAR races at Sonoma Raceway
June 2006 sports events in the United States